Alfredo Oriani (22 August 1852 in Faenza – 18 October 1909 in Casola Valsenio) was an Italian author, writer and social critic. He is often considered a precursor of Fascism, and in 1940 his books were placed on the Index Librorum Prohibitorum of the Catholic Church.

Biography 
Alfredo Oriani was born on 22 August 1852 in Faenza (Ravenna), the youngest of three children. His father Luigi Oriani, belonged to the lower landed gentry. He studied law at Sapienza University of Rome in Rome and at the University of Naples where he received his law degree in 1872. He never practiced, however, but retired to his family's estate to devote most of his life to his writing. In 1892 he unsuccessfully ran for the Italian Parliament.

Oriani began his career as a novelist in the last two decades of the nineteenth century. He published his first collection of short stories, Memorie inutili (Useless Memoirs), under the pen name of Ottone di Banzole, 1876. It was followed in 1877 by Al di là (Beyond), in 1879 by Gramigna (Couchgrass, or Weed), in 1881 by No, in 1883 by Quartetto, then Sullo Scoglio e altri racconti (On the Reef and Other Tales). They are all dark, gloomy narratives, emotional, shaken by an anarchical drive of revolt against society.

Oriani only enjoyed a posthumous fame thanks to his late discovery by Benedetto Croce. La Disfatta (1896), regarded as the best of his novels, received warm praise from Croce, but the revival of interest in Oriani which came about after his death is due principally to the character of his historical and social works - like his 1892 La lotta politica in Italia. Oriani exerted a major influence on Italian politics (as well as an indirect impact on the historiography of the time), which culminated in his being labeled a precursor of Fascism. Oriani's political thinking matured under Giuseppe Mazzini's influence and is reflected in his political essays that were primarily responsible for his belated status with Fascism. According to Israeli historian Meir Michaelis “Oriani translated Mazzini's concept of 'mission' into the language of imperialism”. In Fino a Dogali (As Far as Dogali, 1889), for instance, he offered a justification of Italy's expansion into Africa, stressing the civilizing mission of Italy in the world. La lotta politica in Italia (The political struggle in Italy, 1892) was a lively account of the causes of Italian political decadence from the Fall of the Western Roman Empire to the Risorgimento, which deplored internal discord and called on the Italian nation to resume its civilizing mission in the world by building a modern colonial empire. This work is considered the prototype of modern revisionism of Risorgimento, as opposite to apologetic historiography of Savoy. Oriani put into question the outcome of the events of the Risorgimento. He criticized the "royal conquest" as a unilateral action to create a new state, assuming that without the support of a strong democratic movement, it would prove to be weak in its foundations. Oriani's ideas influenced the thinking of the liberal Piero Gobetti who in 1926 criticized the liberal ruling class in his collection of essays Risorgimento without heroes (Risorgimento senza eroi).

In La rivolta ideale (The Ideal Revolt) published in 1908, Oriani tried to resurrect the lost dimension of a heroic and popular Risorgimento. Oriani tended to examine the history of modern Italy by means of heroic figures, which lead Antonio Gramsci to refer to his historiographical “titanism.” He envisioned a new aristocracy to lead the nation and the people to fully realize their historical destiny and endorsed the need of idealism against nineteenth-century positivism. He lashed against “democracy's plebeian materialism,” and wished for the arrival of a charismatic leader who could change Italy for good.

Oriani died in his residence in Casola Valsenio, on 18 October 1909.

Legacy 
 
Calling for a renewal of the Italian state and a rebirth of ancient Roman imperialism it is no surprise that the nationalists should choose Oriani as their literary hero. Protagonists of nationalism such as Corradini and Federzoni opened the way to the future fascist interpretation of Oriani. Benito Mussolini considered Oriani one of the inspirers of Fascism for his criticism of the late 19th-century bourgeois culture. The posthumous edition of all his works was edited by Mussolini in person (1923–1933). Il Cardello, the old residence of Oriani, who is buried in the surrounding park, became a popular visiting place in Fascist Italy. Mussolini led the 'Marcia al Cardello' here in 1924 and returned on numerous occasions. The most telling testimony to what the place became is the mausoleum (built in 1923-24 by Giulio Arata), on the top of which stands the writer's tomb. Today, Oriani's house - national monument - is used as a writer's house-museum; the building is owned by the Fondazione Casa di Oriani.Georges Sorel, who admired Oriani as a romantic novelist and profound social philosopher, dedicated to him an essay entitled “La rivolta ideale” (L'Indépendance, April 15, 1912). Sorel believed that Oriani combined an aesthetic intuition with philosophic insight. His work, Sorel noted: “a été assez clairvoyant pour prévoir le désastre des scientistes et a contribué à maintenir la noble tradition hégélienne.” Oriani was also appreciated by leftist and anti-Fascist Antonio Gramsci, who wrote about him in his prison notebooks. Gramsci recognised Oriani as the “most honest and impassioned” advocate of “Italian national-popular grandeur” among the older generation of intellectuals.

 Works 

 Memorie inutili (1876)
 Al di là (1877)
 Monotonie - versi di Ottone di Banzole (1878) 
 Gramigne (1879)
 No (1881)
 Quartetto (1883)
 Matrimonio (1886)
 Fino a Dogali (1889) 
 La lotta politica in Italia (1892) 
 Il nemico (1894)
 Gelosia (1894)
 La Disfatta (1896)
 Vortice (1899)
 Olocausto (1902)
 La Bicicletta (1902)
 Oro incenso e mirra (1904)
 La rivolta ideale (1908)

Collected works
 Opera omnia'', edited by Benito Mussolini, 30 vols., Bologna: Cappelli, 1923–1933.

References

Notes

Bibliography

External links

 
 
 

1852 births
1909 deaths
People from Faenza
Italian male writers
20th-century essayists
Italian essayists
Male essayists
19th-century Italian novelists
20th-century Italian novelists
Italian nationalists
Italian literary critics
University of Naples Federico II alumni